The 2012 PDPA Players Championship 9 was one of a series of twenty knockout darts tournaments organised by the Professional Darts Corporation (PDC) that year within the PDC Pro Tour. The winner was the English player Dave Chisnall.

References

2012 PDC Pro Tour